George Kidd may refer to:

 George Balderston Kidd (1794–1852), Dissenting Minister and theological writer
 George Nelson Kidd (1864–1907), Ontario farmer and political figure
 George Kidd (footballer) (1909–1988), Scottish footballer
 George Kidd (ambassador) (1917–2004), Canadian ambassador to Israel, and to Cuba
 George Kidd (wrestler) (1925–1998), Scottish professional wrestler